Paolo Dal Soglio (born 29 July 1970 in Schio) is an Italian shot putter.

At all 2012 season he won 15 medals (6 gold, 6 silver, 3 bronze) at the International athletics competitions.

Biography
Best known for his gold medal at the 1996 European Indoor Championships and the fourth place at the 1996 Olympic Games. His personal best was 21.23 metres, achieved in September 1996 in Grosseto. In his career he won 26 times the national championships.

Progression

Achievements

National titles
12 wins in shot put at the Italian Athletics Championships (1994/1996, 1998/2004, 2011–2012)
14 wins in shot put at the Italian Athletics Indoor Championships (1993/1994, 1996/2004, 2008/2009, 2012)

See also
 Italian Athletics Championships - Multi winners
 Italy national athletics team - More caps
 List of Italian records in masters athletics

References

External links
 

1970 births
Living people
Italian male shot putters
Athletes (track and field) at the 1996 Summer Olympics
Athletes (track and field) at the 2000 Summer Olympics
Olympic athletes of Italy
Mediterranean Games gold medalists for Italy
Mediterranean Games silver medalists for Italy
Athletes (track and field) at the 1993 Mediterranean Games
Athletes (track and field) at the 2001 Mediterranean Games
Universiade medalists in athletics (track and field)
World Athletics Championships athletes for Italy
Mediterranean Games medalists in athletics
Universiade silver medalists for Italy
Italian athletics coaches
Athletics competitors of Centro Sportivo Carabinieri
Medalists at the 1993 Summer Universiade
Medalists at the 1997 Summer Universiade
Italian Athletics Championships winners
People from Schio
Sportspeople from the Province of Vicenza